The Second Petition of the Lord's Prayer has a common liturgical form in English-speaking churches: your kingdom come or thy kingdom come.

Luther's Large Catechism
"Just as God's name is holy in itself and yet we pray that it may be holy among us, so also his kingdom comes of itself without our prayer, and yet we pray that it may come to us, that is, that it may prevail among us and with us, so that we may be a part of those among whom his name is hallowed and his kingdom flourishes."

References

Lord's Prayer